David Mayoral Lastras (born 5 April 1997) is a Spanish footballer who plays mainly as a right winger.

Club career
Mayoral was born in Ávila, Castile and León, and played youth football for Real Ávila and UD Santa Marta. He made his senior debut with the latter on 30 November 2013, in a 2–0 Tercera División away win against CD La Virgen del Camino. He scored his first senior goal on 12 April of the following year, netting the last in a 1–3 loss at CD La Granja.

In July 2014 Mayoral joined Real Valladolid, returning to youth football. He made his first team debut on 21 August 2016, coming on as a late substitute for goalscorer José Arnaiz in a 1–0 Segunda División home win against Real Oviedo.

On 6 March 2017 Mayoral renewed with the Blanquivioletas until 2020, and was immediately loaned to UCAM Murcia CF also in the second tier, until the end of the campaign. Upon returning he was promoted to the first-team, but continued to appear mainly with the B's and contributed with only three appearances in the club's promotion to La Liga.

On 28 August 2018, Mayoral was loaned to second division side AD Alcorcón for the season. Roughly one year later he returned to UCAM, agreeing to a permanent contract with the side now in Segunda División B.

On 25 July 2020, Mayoral moved straight to the top tier after signing a three-year deal with Cádiz CF, but was loaned to Romanian Liga I side FC Hermannstadt on 7 September.

On 24 June 2021, Mayoral moved to CD Lugo in the second level on a one-year loan deal.

References

External links

1997 births
Living people
People from Ávila, Spain
Sportspeople from the Province of Ávila
Spanish footballers
Footballers from Castile and León
Association football wingers
Segunda División players
Segunda División B players
Tercera División players
Real Valladolid Promesas players
Real Valladolid players
UCAM Murcia CF players
AD Alcorcón footballers
Cádiz CF players
CD Lugo players
FC Hermannstadt players
Spain youth international footballers
Spanish expatriate footballers
Spanish expatriate sportspeople in Romania
Expatriate footballers in Romania